Ballistic capture is a low energy method for a spacecraft to achieve an orbit around a distant planet or moon with no fuel required to go into orbit. In the ideal case, the transfer is ballistic (requiring zero Delta-v) after launch.  In the traditional alternative to ballistic capture, spacecraft would use a Hohmann transfer orbit, which requires the spacecraft to burn fuel in order to slow down at the target. A requirement for the spacecraft to carry fuel adds to its cost and complexity.

To achieve ballistic capture the spacecraft is placed on a flight path ahead of the target's orbital path. The spacecraft then falls into the desired orbit, requiring only minor orbit corrections which may only need low power ion thrusters. 

The first paper on using ballistic capture for transfer designed for spacecraft was written in 1987.  The mathematical theory that describes ballistic capture is called Weak Stability Boundary theory. 

Ballistic capture was first used by the Japanese spacecraft Hiten in 1991 as a method to get to the Moon. This was designed by Edward Belbruno and J. Miller. The ballistic capture transfer that performed this is an exterior ballistic capture transfer since it goes beyond the Earth-Moon distance. An interior ballistic capture transfer stays within the Earth-Moon distance.  This was described in 1987 and was first used by the ESA SMART-1 spacecraft in 2004.

Advantages
Ballistic capture is predicted to be:
 safer, as there is no time critical orbit insertion burn,
 launchable at almost any time, rather than having to wait for a narrow launch window,
 more fuel efficient for some missions.

Low-energy transfer

Trajectories that use ballistic capture are also known as a Low energy transfer (LET). More precisely, the terminology ballistic capture transfer (BCT) is used. They are low energy because they use no delta-V for capture. However, a low energy transfer need not be a ballistic capture transfer.  The term ballistic lunar transfer (BLT) is also sometimes used.

The region about a target body where ballistic capture occurs is called a weak stability boundary. The term weak stability boundary transfer is also used, or for short, WSB transfer.  

In 2014, ballistic capture transfer was proposed as an alternate low energy transfer for future Mars missions. It can be performed anytime, not only once per 26 months as in other maneuvers and does not involve dangerous and expensive (fuel cost) braking. But it takes up to one year, instead of nine months for a Hohmann transfer.

Missions using ballistic capture

The following missions have used ballistic capture transfers,   (EBCT – Exterior ballistic capture transfer, IBCT – Interior ballistic capture transfer):

See also 
 Trans-lunar injection

References

Further reading
 Lunar Transfer Orbits Utilizing Solar Perturbations and Ballistic Capture; Wolfgang Seefelder; 2002.
 Low Energy Transfer To The Moon
 Ballistic Lunar Transfer (BLT) Cheat Sheet
 Designing Low Energy Capture Transfers for Spacecraft to the Moon and Mars (Special Seminar in Symplectic Geometry). Institute for Advanced Study, Princeton. Tuesday October, 28  2014

Astrodynamics
Spacecraft propulsion
Orbital maneuvers